Crocodile Garments  is a textile and garments company based in Hong Kong. Crocodile Garments was founded by the late Dr. Chan Shun (1917-1997) in 1952. Ms Vanessa Lam is the current Chairman & CEO of the company.

History 

When he was young, Chan learnt to sew and fix sewing machines, which he used to earn money while traveling between Chinese towns in his teenage years. Chan founded his company, then called the Li Wah Man Shirt Factory , in 1952. The brand of Crocodile Garments was introduced after Chan wanted his products to be as "tough and luxurious as crocodile skin". The company was able to secure the trademark, initially registered in 1910 by Germans before it was confiscated by British authorities after World War II.

Chan retired in 1970 and let his children run the company. Crocodile Garments was first listed on the Hong Kong Stock Exchange in 1971, and in 1987, the business was sold to Lai Sun Garment, controlled by the late billionaire Lim Por Yen.

Crocodile Garments originally sold dress shirts before expanding to become the largest chain garment store in Hong Kong. They exported to Japan, Singapore and other Asian Countries. A second line called Cal-Thomas was started in CA, USA. Crocodile emerged as the leading fashion label with the expansion of a woman's line and children's line called CrocoKids. At its peak, Crocodile garments was the largest garment chain before the conception of G2000, Giordano, U2 and Bossini in the 1990s. In 1980, Crocodile Garments partnered with French clothing company Lacoste to become the sole distributor of Lacoste products in Hong Kong.

Between 2015 and 2020, the share of Crocodile Garments lost 72% of its value. In 2019, the heirs to the Crocodile Garments fortune were ordered by the Canadian fiscal authorities to hand out documents related to an offshore company used by the heirs to make massive donations in Canada.

Legal dispute with Lacoste 

Despite the Hong Kong distribution deal with Lacoste, Crocodile had a long-standing dispute over the logo and clothing lines with the French company. Crocodile uses a crocodile logo that faces left, while Lacoste uses one that faces right. 

Lacoste had registered their trademark in mainland China in 1980, the same year both companies agreed to let Crocodile have exclusive rights to sell Lacoste goods in Hong Kong. When Crocodile attempted to apply for a trademark in mainland China however, Lacoste filed lawsuits in 1998 in both Hong Kong and Beijing, asking for a 3.5-million-yuan compensation. Lacoste alleged that as part of their distribution agreement, Crocodile promised to not use any logo similar to Lacoste's outside of Hong Kong.

Lacoste won their Hong Kong lawsuit in 1999. The two fought an extended fight for the logo rights in China, but eventually reached a compromise in 2003. Crocodile agreed to change its logo to have a more vertical tail and more scales for its logo. In 2013, Crocodile Garments won the right to appeal this trademark agreement in New Zealand. In 2017, the NZ Supreme Court reinforced the "use it or lose it" trademark rule to argue in favor of Crocodile Garments' request to annul Lacoste's exclusive use of the crocodile since the French company does not commercialize its products in New Zealand.

References

External links
Official Website

Companies listed on the Hong Kong Stock Exchange
Clothing brands of Hong Kong
Clothing companies of Hong Kong
Lai Sun Group
Clothing retailers of Hong Kong